Duras is a traditional French variety of red wine grape that is mostly grown around the river Tarn, northeast of Toulouse. It is usually blended with other traditional varieties, but production has been declining in recent years.

Despite the name the grape appears to have no connection with the Côtes de Duras east of Bordeaux, and is not grown there today. Nor is there any known link with the Durasa of Piedmont.

History
Viticulture came to the Tarn with the Romans, but little is known of the history of Duras.

DNA fingerprinting has recently suggested that with Petit Verdot from Bordeaux, it is a parent of the Tressot variety.

Distribution and Wines
Duras is only really found in the upper reaches of the Tarn, in Gaillac, the Côtes de Millau and the Vins d'Estaing north of Rodez. It makes robust red wines with a peppery note that are typically blended with other traditional varieties such as Fer and Négrette.

Vine and Viticulture
The vine is susceptible to oidium and black rot with a tendency to bud early.

Synonyms
Cabernet Duras, Durade, Duras Femelle, Duras Male, Duras Rouge, Durasca, Duraze

See also
 Tannat
 Malbec

References

Further reading
 Robinson, Jancis (2006) The Oxford Companion to Wine, third edition, OUP

External links
 VIVC Bibliography

Red wine grape varieties